Hayden Wilde (born 1 September 1997) is a New Zealand professional triathlete. He was the bronze medallist at the Tokyo Summer Olympics, the silver medalist at the 2022 Commonwealth Games and the winner of the 2021 XTERRA World Championships. He finished second in the 2021 Super League Triathlon Championship Series, having taken the win at the SLT London race. Wilde won the 2022 Super League Triathlon Championship Series, having been victorious in 3 of the 5 series races.

Personal life
Wilde was born in Taupō, is the youngest of three brothers, and grew up in Whakatāne, New Zealand. Wilde attended Trident High School.  Growing up Wilde played soccer and hockey before moving into running for fitness.

Career
Wilde has been coached by Craig Kirkwood since 2016 and currently trains in Tauranga, New Zealand. Wilde only took up Triathlon after watching the event at the 2016 Rio Olympics.

Wilde comes from a long-distance off-road background and has previously been the ITU Cross Tri U23 World Champion.

Career Highlights include:
 3rd place at the 2019 Tokyo ITU World Triathlon Olympic Qualification Event
 4th place at the 2019 ITU World Triathlon Edmonton
 6th place at the 2019 Hamburg Wasser World Triathlon
 10th place at the 2019 Daman World Triathlon Abu Dhabi
 1st place at the 2019 Devonport OTU Sprint Triathlon Oceania Championships
 3rd place at the 2020 Tokyo Summer Olympics.
 2nd place in the 2021 Super League Triathlon Championship Series.
 Halberg award finalist for  New Zealand’s Favourite Sporting Moment 2022 for Tokyo Olympics Bronze medal win

2019 season

Wilde finished the season in 11th place in the ITU World Triathlon Series rankings, with 2019 being the first year he appeared in the top 50.

2021 season
Wilde finished fifth on the World Cup circuit in Leeds and third at the Europe Triathlon Championships in Austria. Wilde won the Super League Triathlon London race, ahead of France's Vincent Luis and British Athlete Jonny Brownlee. He went on to finish the 2021 Super League Triathlon Championship Series in 2nd, behind Britain's Alex Yee.

2022 season 
Wilde won the Arena Games Triathlon 2022 Series finale, held at Marina Bay, Singapore. It was his debut racing at Arena Games Triathlon format. This result was also good enough to see Wilde finish fifth in the inaugural Esport Triathlon World Championship.

He won a silver medal at the 2022 Commonweath Games.  This was however meet with controversy when he was penalized for not racking his bike correctly costing him a ten second penalty, ultimately  losing out on the gold to England's Alex Yee.  Despite this Wildes sportsmanship was praised by the press and on social media.

Wilde made a strong start to the 2022 Super League Triathlon (SLT) season. He defended his SLT London title, with his second win in the British capital in as many years, and then finished third in SLT Munich the following week. Wilde followed up his early season success with further victories at SLT Malibu and SLT Toulouse, Super League's first event to be held in France. Wilde finished third at the 2022 SLT series finale in NEOM, this was enough for him to secure the overall series victory.

Wilde contested his penalty at the Triathlon at the 2022 Commonwealth Games but this was  later rejected.

Sponsorship and advertising

April 2022 saw Wilde gain sponsorship from Red Bull.

World Triathlon Series competitions 
Wilde's World Triathlon Series race results are:

World Triathlon Cup competitions 
Wilde's World Triathlon Cup Series race results are:;

References

1997 births
Living people
New Zealand male triathletes
Triathletes at the 2020 Summer Olympics
Olympic bronze medalists for New Zealand
Medalists at the 2020 Summer Olympics
Olympic medalists in triathlon
Olympic triathletes of New Zealand
Sportspeople from Taupō
20th-century New Zealand people
21st-century New Zealand people
Commonwealth Games silver medallists for New Zealand
Triathletes at the 2022 Commonwealth Games
Commonwealth Games medallists in triathlon
Medallists at the 2022 Commonwealth Games